The Green Corridor project is a four-year initiative that started in June 2004, implemented by the WWF (World) Wide Fund for Nature) Greater Mekong Programme and Thừa Thiên Huế Provincial Forest Protection Department. According to the agreement signed in Huế on May 7, 2004, The Global Environment Facility, the World Wildlife Fund, and the Development Organisation of the Netherlands have donated two million US dollars to protect biodiversity. The project also receives funding from Thừa Thiên Huế Provincial People's Committee. In addition, funds have been provided by the US Fish and Wildlife Service, under the Multinational Species Conservation Fund and the Concannon Foundation, for primate surveys and conservation work. A Green Corridor containing 1,340 square kilometres of precious forest in the districts of A Luoi, Nam Dong and Huong Thuy of Thừa Thiên–Huế Province will be better protected with a new method of ensuring higher efficiency. The project, to be carried out from 2004 to 2008, will benefit the local community and reduce the exploitation of forest resources and threats on endangered animal species.

New species 

Eleven new species of animals and plants were discovered in the Green Corridor between 2005 and 2006. They include two butterflies and a snake, as well as five orchids and three other plants, all of which are exclusive to tropical forests in Vietnam's Annamite Mountains. Ten other plant species, including four orchids, are still under examination but also appear to be new species. Several large mammal species, including the saola, were discovered in the same forests in the 1990s.

The new snake species, called the white-lipped keelback (Hebius leucomystax), tends to live by streams where it catches frogs and other small animals. It has a yellow-white stripe that sweeps along its head and red dots cover its body. It can reach about 80 centimeters in length.

The butterfly species are among eight discovered in the province since 1996. One is a skipper — a butterfly with quick, darting flight habits — from the genus Zela. The other is a new genus in the subfamily of Satyrinae.

Three of the new orchid species are entirely leafless, which is rare for orchids. They contain no chlorophyll and live on decaying matter. The other new plants include an aspidistra, which produces a flower that is nearly black. A newly discovered aroid species has beautiful yellow spathes (aroids often have funnel-shaped spathes surrounding their tiny flowers, which are clustered together on a spadix).

Species at risk 

According to WWF, all these species are at risk from illegal logging, hunting, unsustainable extraction of natural resources and conflicting development interests. However, the Thừa Thiên–Huế Province authorities — in particular the Forest Protection Department — have committed to conserve and sustainably manage these valuable forests.

"The area is extremely important for conservation and the province wants to protect the forests and their environmental services, as well as contribute to sustainable development", said Hoang Ngoc Khanh, Director of Thừa Thiên Huế Provincial Forest Protection Department.

Recent surveys have shown that many threatened species are found in the Green Corridor, including 15 reptiles and amphibians and six bird species. The area is also home to Vietnam's greatest number of white-cheeked crested gibbons, one of the world's most endangered primates. The Green Corridor is believed to be the best location in Vietnam to conserve the saola, a unique type of wild cattle only discovered by scientists in 1992.

Economic value 

Forests in the Annamites also help preserve critical environmental services, such as water supplies for thousands of people who depend on the region's rivers. They also provide non-timber forest resources for local ethnic minority groups who earn more than half of their income from these products.

References

External links
The Green Corridor Project

Forests of Vietnam
Nature conservation in Vietnam
Thừa Thiên Huế province
Forestry in Vietnam